Das merkwürdige Verhalten geschlechtsreifer Großstädter zur Paarungszeit (English title – Love Scenes from Planet Earth) is a 1998 German romantic comedy film. It earned the director Marc Rothemund a Bavarian Film Award for "Best Young Director". It was the second highest grossing domestic film in Germany in 1998. The film is a comedy centering on the lives of eight Germans who long for sexual excitement.

Cast
Christoph Waltz
Ann-Kathrin Kramer

Michaela May
Anica Dobra

Oliver Korittke

Markus Knüfken
Cosma Shiva Hagen
Tobias Schenke
Gudrun Landgrebe
Bernd Tauber
Jakob von Moers
Frederic Welter

Soundtrack
 Scatman John - Scatmambo (Patricia)	 
 Talk Of The Town -	Te Quiero Mambo	
 Willy DeVille - Demasiado Corazon	 
 Gipsy Kings -	Volare	3:40	 
 Viktor Lazlo -	Amores (Besame Mucho)	 
 Compay Segundo -	Chan Chan		 
 Afro-Cuban All Stars -	Amor Verdadero	 
 Dean Martin -	That's Amore	
 Jackeline Castellanos & Los Tropicales -	Tu Libertad		 
 D.A. Niel -	Guarachando	
 Princessa -	Baila Al Ritmo	
 Angelo Garcia -	Carino Presumido		 
 Compay Segundo -	El Camison De Pepa	 
 Rubén González -	Tumbao	
 Gloria Estefan -	Oye Mi Canto	 
 Sierra Maestra -	Tibiri Tabara		 
 Dos Amigos -	Mambo	 
 Louis Prima -	Buona Sera	 
 Cherie -	Charlie's Blues	 
 Reinhard Besser -	Score Trilogy

The soundtrack peaked on the German album charts at No. 94.

References

External links

1998 films
1998 romantic comedy films
German romantic comedy films
1990s German-language films
Films directed by Marc Rothemund
1990s German films